Rolando Tucker (born 31 December 1971) is a Cuban former fencer. He won a bronze medal in the team foil event at the 1996 Summer Olympics. He won the 1994 World Championships.

References

External links
 

1971 births
Living people
Cuban male fencers
Olympic fencers of Cuba
Fencers at the 1996 Summer Olympics
Fencers at the 2000 Summer Olympics
Olympic bronze medalists for Cuba
Olympic medalists in fencing
Sportspeople from Havana
Medalists at the 1996 Summer Olympics
Pan American Games medalists in fencing
Pan American Games gold medalists for Cuba
Pan American Games silver medalists for Cuba
Universiade medalists in fencing
Fencers at the 1999 Pan American Games
Universiade gold medalists for Cuba
Medalists at the 1997 Summer Universiade
Medalists at the 1999 Summer Universiade
Medalists at the 1999 Pan American Games
20th-century Cuban people
21st-century Cuban people